Eugene Carl Lenz (April 12, 1937 – October 10, 2005) was an American competition swimmer who represented the United States at the 1960 Summer Olympics in Rome.  Lenz competed in the men's 400-meter freestyle, advanced to the finals, and finished seventh overall with a time of 4:26.8.

See also
 List of Cal Poly at San Luis Obispo alumni

References

1937 births
2005 deaths
American male freestyle swimmers
Cal Poly Mustangs
College men's swimmers in the United States
Olympic swimmers of the United States
People from San Luis Obispo, California
Swimmers at the 1960 Summer Olympics
Pan American Games medalists in swimming
Pan American Games bronze medalists for the United States
Swimmers at the 1959 Pan American Games
Medalists at the 1959 Pan American Games